Evan Arthur Bertram Hughes (11 July 1925 – 22 December 2012) was Archdeacon of Carmarthen from 1985 until 1991.

Hughes was educated at St David's College, Lampeter and ordained in 1950. After curacies in Abergwili and Llanelly, he became a CMS missionary in  India. He was Archdeacon of Bhagalpur from 1965 to 1966; and then of Patna from 1966 to 1969. He was Vicar of Johnston from 1974 until 1980 and  then of Newcastle Emlyn until his Archdeacon’s appointment.

References

1925 births
2012 deaths
Alumni of the University of Wales, Lampeter
Archdeacons of Carmarthen